Love is a Foetus album released on CD by Ectopic Ents/Birdman Records in 2005.  Initial copies include a DVD disc with additional content. It features a dramatic shift in tone and style compared to previous Foetus releases, being more atmospheric and emotional in tone.

Love is Ectopic Ents #ECT ENTS 027.

Track listing

CD
All songs by J. G. Thirlwell
"(Not Adam)" – 4:11
"Mon Agonie Douce" – 3:29
"Aladdin Reverse" – 7:30
"Miracle" – 4:48
"Don't Want Me Anymore" – 6:44
"Blessed Evening" – 3:41
"Pareidolia" – 6:01
"Thrush" – 6:53
with Jennifer Charles
"Time Marches On" – 3:07
"How to Vibrate" – 8:31

DVD

Love: The Videos
"Blessed Evening" (directed by Karen O, lensed by Spike Jonze)
"(Not Adam)" (directed by Jeremy Solterbeck)

Love: The Short Films
"How to Vibrate" (directed by Kurt Ralske)
"Mon Agonie Douce" (directed by Clément Tuffreau)

Extras
"I'll Meet You in Poland Baby" (taken from the Male DVD)
"Mary Magdalene" (performed by Rotoskop and featuring vocals by J. G. Thirlwell)
The Venture Bros. 5 trailers (score by J. G. Thirlwell)
A Foetus Life: A Documentary on J. G. Thirlwell 2 trailers (directed by Clément Tuffreau)
"Verklemmt" (directed by Alex Winter) ("hidden" title 17, not available via the menus)

Personnel
J. G. Thirlwell – All instruments and vocals, except:
Pamelia Kurstin – Theremin (7)
Jeff Davidson – Trumpet (9)
Christian Gibbs – Guitar (9)
Kurt Wolf – Rhythm guitars (4)
Jennifer Charles – Vocals (8)

Production
J. G. Thirlwell – Production, composition, arrangements, recording, mixing, sleeve design
Scott Hull – Mastering
Heung-Heung Chin – Art direction

External links
Love at foetus.org
Love at Discogs

2005 albums
Foetus (band) albums
Albums produced by JG Thirlwell
Birdman Records albums